Leandro N. Alem Partido is a partido in the north of Buenos Aires Province in Argentina.

Name
The Partido is named in honour of Leandro Nicéforo Alem, an Argentine politician, founder of the Radical Civic Union political party, and mentor to Hipólito Yrigoyen, who became President of Argentina.

Settlements
Vedia (pop. 8,089)
Leandro N. Alem (pop. 16,358)
Juan B. Alberdi
Alberdi Viejo (pop. 336)
El Dorado (pop. 316)
Fortín Acha (pop. 93)
Perkins (pop. 2,430)
Trigales

External links
 provincial Website

1918 establishments in Argentina
Partidos of Buenos Aires Province